A hybrid PAC (sometimes called a Carey Committee) is a political committee classification in the United States. It is used by the Federal Election Commission to describe a committee with certain spending and contribution limitations.

The term is related to "super PAC", a committee which may not make contributions to candidate campaigns or parties, but may engage in unlimited political spending independently of the campaigns. Unlike super PACs, however, a hybrid PAC can give limited amounts of money directly to campaigns and committees, while still making independent expenditures in unlimited amounts.

The hybrid PAC is required to maintain two separate bank accounts for the two types of expenditures, and to register with the FEC and report all receipts and disbursements for both accounts. In essence, the hybrid PAC is the equivalent of a traditional PAC and a super PAC operating under the same roof.

History
The hybrid PAC has its origins in the Carey v. the Federal Election Commission case, brought in 2012 by retired United States Navy Rear Admiral James J. Carey. Dan Backer, Carey's attorney in the case, argued that the current laws governing campaign contributions prohibited "a nonconnected political committee from soliciting and accepting unlimited contributions to one bank account designated for independent expenditures, while maintaining a second, separate bank account designated for source- and amount-limited contributions to candidates and their authorized political committees." A judge in the D.D.C. ruled in Carey's favor, which opened the door for any PAC or super PAC to reclassify themselves as a hybrid PAC.

References

Campaign finance in the United States
Political terminology of the United States
Lobbying in the United States